The 2017 IHF Men's Junior World Championship was the 21st edition of the tournament, held in Algiers, Algeria from 18 to 30 July 2017. It was the first time that Algeria staged the competition, and the third time that it was held in Africa.

Spain won their first title by defeating Denmark 39–38 in the final. France captured the bronze medal after they beat Germany 23–22.

Venues
The games of the tournament were played in Algiers.

Qualified teams

Draw
The draw was held on 10 May 2017.

Seedings
The seedings were announced on 8 May 2017.

Referees
15 referee pairs are selected:

Preliminary round
The schedule was announced on 7 June 2017.

All times are local (UTC+1).

Group A

Group B

Group C

Group D

President's Cup
17th place bracket

21st place bracket

21st–24th place semifinals

17th–20th place semifinals

23rd place game

21st place game

19th place game

17th place game

9–16th placement games
The eight losers of the round of 16 were seeded according to their results in the preliminary round against teams ranked 1–4 and play an elimination game to determine their final position.

15th place game

13th place game

Eleventh place game

Ninth place game

Knockout stage

Bracket

5th place bracket

Round of 16

Quarterfinals

5th–8th place semifinals

Semifinals

Seventh place game

Fifth place game

Third place game

Final

Final ranking

Statistics

Top goalscorers

Source: IHF

Top goalkeepers

Source: IHF

Awards

MVP
Left-back:  Lasse Møller

All-star team
Goalkeeper:  Xoan Ledo
Right wing:  Aleix Gómez
Right back:  Dika Mem
Centre back:  Mátyás Győri
Left back:  Lasse Møller
Left wing:  Lukas Mertens
Pivot:  Magnus Saugstrup

References

External links
Official website

2017 Junior
Men's Junior World Handball Championship
International handball competitions hosted by Algeria
2017 in Algerian sport
Sport in Algiers
July 2017 sports events in Europe